Daniel Brown (24 February 1908 – 20 March 1972) was a South African cricketer. He played in two first-class matches for Eastern Province in 1929/30.

See also
 List of Eastern Province representative cricketers

References

External links
 

1908 births
1972 deaths
South African cricketers
Eastern Province cricketers
Cricketers from Port Elizabeth